Newbury Township may refer to the following townships in the United States:

 Newbury Township, LaGrange County, Indiana
 Newbury Township, Geauga County, Ohio